Cumbrian toponymy refers to the study of place names in Cumbria, a county in North West England, and as a result of the spread of the ancient Cumbric language, further parts of northern England and the Southern Uplands of Scotland.

The history of Cumbria is marked by a long and complex history of human settlement. Geographically, Cumbria is situated near the centrepoint of the British Isles. The contrasting landscapes between the mountains and the fertile coastal areas and the rich variety of mineral resources available in the county have made it a desirable area for habitation since the Upper Paleolithic, and various ethnic groups have been drawn to the area, leaving their linguistic mark since the Iron Age.

Linguistic influences

Sources
Whaley provides a summary of the history of linguistic influences on, plus a dictionary of, the place-names of the area covered by the Lake District National Park, plus entries for Kendal, Cockermouth and Penrith, Cumbria. The five much earlier volumes of the English Place-Name Society cover the whole of the former counties of Cumberland, and Westmorland. Ekwall covers Lancashire, the northern part of which now lies within Cumbria.

Brythonic

Since at least the Iron Age, the inhabitants of Cumbria would have spoken Common Brittonic, which is the ancestor of modern Welsh, Cornish, and Breton.  Evidence of this language is mostly visible in topographical features such as rivers (Kent, Eden, Ehen, Levens) and mountains (Blencathra, Helvellyn,  Coniston Old Man).

In the first millennium AD the Brythonic  spoken in north west England and southern Scotland developed into a separate strain called Cumbric. It is likely that most place names with Brythonic influences have survived from this time (Carlisle, Penrith, Penruddock)

British influenced place names exist throughout the whole county, but are particularly common around the river valleys of the Lake District and around the coastal plains of the Solway Firth.

Common Brythonic elements
*blain (Welsh blaen) - 'summit' → blen-
*cair (Welsh caer) - 'fort'
*creic, *carrek (W. craig, carreg) - 'rock' → crag
*din (W. din) - 'fort'
*penn (W. pen) - 'hill', 'head'

Old English

Angles from Deira and Bernicia (later Northumbria) would have gradually filtered into Cumbria since the 5th century, but the area retained a distinctly British identity until at least the 8th century.  Settlement by the English began in the north, with settlers following the line of Hadrian's Wall and traversing Stainmore Pass then settling the Eden Valley before making their way along the north coast.  Some time later they would have begun to move into the Kent Valley, Cartmel and Furness, gradually moving further north along the west coast.

Surviving place names have been taken to show that the Anglo-Saxons stayed out of the mountainous central region and remained in the lowlands, but after the Celtic kingdom of Rheged was annexed to English Northumbria sometime before 730 AD, the Celtic language of Cumbric was slowly replaced by Old English
.  As a result, Old English elements can be found throughout the county, but mostly in the names of towns and villages (Workington, Millom).  Very few rivers or mountains contain Old English elements (Eamont, Stainmore), but many of the lakes contain the element mere, meaning 'lake'.

Common Old English elements
hām - 'homestead, village, manor, estate'
-inga- - 'belonging to the sons or people of...'
mere, mær(e) - 'pond, lake' → mere
tūn - 'farmstead, enclosure, village'
wīc - 'settlement, farm' (from Latin vicus, often found near Roman roads) → -wick, -wich

Old Norse

The Norse appear to have arrived in Cumbria in about 925 AD and left a huge impression upon the toponymy of Cumbria.  Originally from Norway, it is generally accepted that they would have come here via their colonies in Iceland, Ireland and the Isle of Man, perhaps bringing with them a touch of Gaelic influence. Placenames with thwaite, which are commonplace in Cumbria, are also abundant in the southern counties of Hordaland, Rogaland, Agder and Telemark in Norway proper, and less in use elsewhere (Norwegian: tveit, tvedt).

It seems they would have arrived around the south west of the county and penetrated into the uplands of the central region where the Old Norse influence is dominant.  Many mountains, rivers and valleys have Norse names, as attested by the abundance of the elements fell, -ay and dale (Mickledore, Scafell, Rothay, Duddon, Langsleddale, Allerdale).  Many town and villages also contain Norse elements (Keswick, Whitehaven, Ravenglass, Silloth, Ulverston, Ambleside)

Common Old Norse elements
á - 'river'
bekkr - 'stream' → beck
dalr - 'valley' → dale
fors - 'waterfall' → force/foss
fjall - 'mountain' (usually a large, flat mountain) → fell
gil - 'ravine' → gill, ghyll
haugr - 'hill' → howe
holmr - 'island' → holme
intaka - 'intake'
pic - 'peak' → pike
sætr - 'shieling' → side, seat
tjorn - 'small lake' → tarn
þveit - 'clearing' → thwaite
tún - 'farm'

There are also a number of Danish influenced place names (Allonby, Thursby, Ousby, Milnthorpe), but the majority are situated along the Eden Valley and the north coast of the county, suggesting that they might have come across Stainmore around the 9th century AD.

Common Danish elements
by - 'home' (may be Old Norse, but more often Danish)
þorp - 'secondary settlement' → thorpe

Goidelic Celtic and Irish influence

Some names show evidence of Irish or Norse-Gaelic influence (Kirksanton, Ireleth, Ireby). Several Gaelic Saints are recalled in Cumbrian place names, including St. Bega, St. Brigid, and St. Sanctan. 
The influence of the early Celtic Church in Northumbria and Cumbria was considerable.

Anglo-Norman and Middle English

At the time of the Norman conquest in 1066, it is likely that a mixture of Norse and Old English would have been spoken throughout most of Cumbria, which persisted until the spread of Middle English after the 12th century.  The Domesday Book of 1086 lists only a few places in the south of the region, as at this time most of northern and central Cumbria was part of Scotland, but with several battles over the following centuries the whole area became part of England.

The influence of Anglo-Norman is usually confined to manorial names and residences and often include a personal name to distinguish between two places belonging to different lords (Egremont, Beaumont, Maulds Meaburn, Crosby Garret, Ponsonby, Grange).

Although it is often difficult to distinguish between a Middle English name and an earlier one, some places do seem to contain elements (Tod Ghyll, Brocklebank, Ladyholme, Cam Spout, Monk Coniston, Newlands, Sweden Bridge)

Common Anglo-Norman and Middle English elements
grange - 'farm' (usually belonging to a monastery)
great - 'large' (denoting the larger of two places)
ground - (denoting land belonging to a person, divided from monastic lands after the Dissolution of the Monasteries in 1536)
little - (denoting the smaller of two places)
monk - (referring to land belonging to a monastery, usually Furness Abbey)
mont - 'hill'

Modern names

Several places in Cumbria have been renamed in more recent times, (Belle Isle, Maryport, Longtown, Sprinkling Tarn)

Examples

Abbreviations used in the following descriptions 
OE  Old English
ON  Old Norse
Da  Danish
Br  Brythonic Celtic
Go  Goidelic Celtic
Ir  Irish
Sc  Scottish
AN  Anglo-Norman

Areas 

Allerdale  'valley of River Ellen'
Copeland  'bargained land, bought land' from ON kaupa land
Cumbria  'land of the Cymry' (the Brythonic name for the British people of the area, related to Welsh Cymru, from a Brittonic *kombrogi meaning 'fellow countrymen').
Cumberland  'land of the Cymry' from the OE Cumbra land
Furness  'further promontory' from OE fuðor and ON nes, the oldest form of the name is Fuþþernessa (c1150)
Grizedale Forest  'valley with pigs' from ON gris dalr
Morecambe Bay 'crooked sea' from Br *mori- & *kambo-.  The name was recorded in Ptolemy's Geographica c.150AD as Morikambe, apparently referring to the Lune Estuary.  It was subsequently lost then revived in the 19th century as both the name for the bay and the new Lancashire seaside resort at Poulton-le-Sands.
Solway Firth  'Muddy ford estuary' from ON sol vath fjórðr - or from the Celtic tribal name Selgovae
Westmorland  'land of the people living west of the moors' from OE west mōr inga land.  The name presumably dates from the time when Westmorland was part of Northumbria and ruled from the east.

Rivers

Bleng  'dark river' from ON blaengir, blá
Brathay  'broad river' from ON breiðr á
Calder  'rocky, fast flowing river' from Br *kaleto *dubro
Caldew  'cold river' from OE cald ēa
Cocker  'crooked river' from Br *kukrā
Crake  possibly 'stoney river' from Br *kraki 'stones'
Dacre  'trickling stream' from Br *dakru 'tear'
Derwent  'oaken valley' from Br *derwentio
Duddon  uncertain.  Possibly 'Dudda's valley' from an OE personal name and denu or an unknown Br name containing *dubo, 'dark'.
Eamont  'meeting of the rivers' from OE ēa (ge)mot
Eden  Uncertain.  Mills suggests 'water' from a Celtic source, but gives no cognate.
Eea  simply means 'river' from ON á or OE ēa
Ehen  probably 'cold river' from a Br word related to Welsh iain, 'icy cold'
Esk  'water' from Br *isca
Gilpin  named for the Gilpin family
Greta  'rocky river' from ON grjót á
Irt  possibly 'fresh' from Br *ir
Kent  probably from Br *cunetio meaning 'sacred one'
Leven  'smooth-flowing river' from a Br word related to Welsh llyfn, 'smooth'
Liza  'shining river' from ON ljós á
Lowther  'foaming river' from ON lauðr á
Lune  'healthy, pure' from Br Alōna (cf Ialonus)
Lyvennet  'abounding in elm trees' probably from a Br word related to Welsh llwyf, 'elm' (cf Derwent)
Mite  probably meaning 'drizzling' from Br meigh (to urinate, to drizzle), ON miga or OE migan
Rawthey  'red river' from ON rauð á
Rothay  'trout river' from ON rauði á
Sprint  'gushing' from ON spretta
Wampool  possibly OE, signifying 'Wōden's pool'
Waver  'restless' from OE wæfre (cf wave)
Winster  'the left-hand river' from ON vinstri á

Lakes

Bassenthwaite Lake  'Bastun's clearing' from an OE personal name Beabstan, or an NF nickname Bastun and ON þveit
Brothers Water  either 'broad water' from ON breiðr vatn or 'brothers' water' from ON bróðirs vatn (there are legends of two brothers drowning in this lake)
Buttermere  'lake by dairy pastures' from OE butere mere
Coniston Water  named after the village, which means 'king's farmstead from ON konigs tun
Crummock Water  'lake of the crooked river', linking the name with the River Cocker which flows through it.  Related to Br *crumbaco
Derwentwater  named after the River Derwent
Devoke Water  'little dark one' from a Br word *dubaco
Elter Water  'swan lake' from ON eltr vatn
Ennerdale Water  named after the valley in which it is situated
Grasmere  'lake in pasture' or 'grassy lake' from OE græs mere
Haweswater  'Hafr's lake' or 'he-goat's lake'  from the ON hafs vatn
Hayeswater  'Eithr's lake' from an ON Eiths vatn
Loweswater  'leafy lake' from ON lauf saer, ON vatn or OE wæter was added later
Rydal Water  named after the valley of Rydal; formerly called Routhmere, linking the lake with the River Rothay
Tarn Hows  probably 'hill tarn' from ON tjórn haugr
Thirlmere  'lake with a gap' from OE thyrel mere
Ullswater  uncertain.  Possibly named after a Norse chief Ulf or a local Saxon lord named Ulphus; or from the Norse god Ullr
Wast Water  'Wasdale Water'. The name literally means 'water water' from ON vatn and OE wæter
Windermere  'Vinandr's lake' from ON personal name 'Vinandr' and OE 'mere'

Mountains, fells and hills

Birker Fell  'birch hill' from ON bjirk haugr
Black Combe  'dark-crested mountain' from OE blæc camb, not to be confused with Br combe meaning 'valley'.
Blencathra  'chair-shaped bare hill' or "Devil's Peak" from Cumbric *blein *cadeir or *blein *cuthrol
Cat Bells  'den of the wild cat' from OE catt and ME belde
Catstye Cam  'ridge with wild cat's path'  from ON katts stigr kambr or OE catt stig camb
Causey Pike cf causeway
Coniston Old Man  named after the town at its foot, the Old Man comes from Br maen meaning stone
Dollywaggon Pike  dollywaggons were sled-like barrows used to transport stone and minerals down the sides of steep mountains when mining was common in the Lake District.  Pike means 'peak' from ON pík
Harter Fell  'deer hill' from ON hjartar haugr
Helvellyn  Coates suggests a Cumbric *hal velyn - "Yellow Moorland"
High Street  named after the Roman road which passed along it, a literal translation of the Latin via alta; the summit of this hill is named
Mellbreak Cumbric *moil brïχ or possibly Gaelic maol breac both meaning "speckled hill"
Racecourse Hill after locals used the flat area for fairs in the 18th and 19th centuries
St Sunday Crag  Saint Sunday is the local name for Saint Dominic, though how he is connected to the mountain is unknown.  Crag means 'rock' from the Br carreg
Scafell Pike
Skiddaw - Diana Whaley suggests "'the mountain with the jutting crag'". However, the first element may be a personal name or Old Norse skítr 'dung, filth, shit' Richard Coates suggests that "it is possible that a Cumbric solution is to be sought."
Stainmore  'stoney moor'  from OE stān mōr

Valleys

Borrowdale  'valley with a fort' from ON borgar dalr
Dunnerdale  'valley of the River Duddon'
Ennerdale  'valley of the River Ehen'
Langdale  'long valley' from ON lang dalr
Lonsdale  'valley of the River Lune'
Mardale  'valley with a lake' from ON marr dalr
Patterdale  'Patrick's valley', possibly named after St Patrick or, more likely, a later Norse-Irish settler
Sleddale  'valley with flat land' from ON sletta dalr
Wasdale  'valley of water' from ON vatns dalr

Towns and villages

Aspatria  'Patrick's Ash' from ON asc and the personal name
Barrow-in-Furness  'headland island' from Br barr and ON ey
Blennerhasset   'Hay farm on a hill' from the Cumbric *blein 'steep faced slope' plus ON haysaetr
Bootle  'huts, shelter' from ON buðl
Bowness  'promontory shaped like a bow' from ON bogi nes
Cark  'rock' from Br carreg
Carlisle  'fort of the God Lugus' from Br *Luguwalion -> Lat Luguvalium -> OE Luel -> Cumbric Cair Luel (Welsh - Caer Liwelydd)
Cockermouth  'mouth of the River Cocker'
Dalton-in-Furness  'farm in a valley' from ON dalr tun
Frizington  'farm/settlement of the Friesen people' from OE Fris, inga and tun
Grange-over-Sands  'outlying farm belonging to a monastery' from the ME grange.  -over-Sands was probably added in the 19th century when the town prospered as a holiday resort overlooking Morecambe Bay. The term 'over-sands' may also refer to the ancient act of traversing Morecambe Bay sands as a means of shortening the travel distance in the area.
Hawkshead  uncertain.  The 'hawks-' might either mean 'hawk' or be the ON personal name Haukr and the '-head' may mean 'head' from OE heofod or 'summer farm, shieling' from ON saetr
Kendal  'valley of the River Kent' from ON Kent dalr
Keswick  'cheese farm' from OE cēse wic[also ON "vik" 'landing place' (i.e. village)]
Kirkby  'village with a church' from ON kirk by
Maryport  named after the wife of Humphrey Senhouse who developed the town into a port.  It was originally called Ellenfoot as it stood at the foot of the River Ellen but was changed in 1756 as the town developed.
Millom  'mills' from OE millen
Milnthorpe  'village with mills' from OE millen and Da þorp
Threlkeld  'thrall's well' from ON þrœl kelda
Ulpha  'wolf hill' from ON ulfr haugr
Ulverston  'Ulfr's farmstead' from ON Ulfrs tun (ulfr is also the ON word for 'wolf')
Whitehaven  'white harbour' from ON hvit hafn
Workington  'farm/settlement of Weorc's people' from OE Weorc, inga and tun

Islands

Belle Isle, Windermere  'beautiful isle' from Fr 
 originally named , ON 'long island', it was renamed in 1781 by its new owner Isabella Curwen
Chapel Island, Morecambe Bay  named for the chapel built here in the 14th century by monks from nearby Conishead Priory to serve the needs of travellers and fishermen on the sands of Morecambe Bay.
Foulney Island, Morecambe Bay  'island of birds' from ON  and ON 
 Foulney is now a bird sanctuary and site of special scientific interest
Ladyholme, Windermere  'island of Our Lady'. ME, using ON 
 St Mary's hermitage was here, mentioned 1272
Lord's Island, Derwentwater  probably named after the Earls of Derwentwater.
Piel Island, Morecambe Bay  named after Piel Castle.
The island was originally called Foudrey or Fotheray, possibly from ON  meaning 'fodder island', and the castle was called the 'Pile [Peel] of Fotherey'.
Rampsholme, Derwentwater probably 'Hrafn's island' from ON  or 'wild garlic island' with the OE .
Roa Island, Morecambe Bay  'Red Island' from ON 
 the area is rich in red haematite
St. Herbert's Island, Derwentwater  named after the 7th-century saint who was a hermit on this island.
 the island became a place of pilgrimage by 1374
Walney, Irish Sea  'Isle of the British' from ON 
 the Old English name for Walney was Wagneia, 'island of quicksands'. In the Domesday Book it is called Houganai or island of Hougun.  Hougun, from the Old Norse word  meaning hill or mound, is also the name given to Furness in Domesday.

See also 

Cumbria
Lake District
Cumbric language
History of Cumbria
Welsh placenames
The Brittonic Language in the Old North

References 

Toponym
Celtic toponyms
Place name etymologies
English toponymy
History of Cumbria
Geography of Cumbria